La granja (Catalan: The farm) is a Spanish television series produced by Catalan-language channel TV3 about a family that owns a pub in Barcelona. It aired from 1989 to 1992.

Context
In 1989, Joaquin Maria Puyal was assigned as director and presenter of a debate program that aired on Friday nights, La vida en un xip, just after the news. In order to maintain the viewers, he decided to create a small series of fiction that would link the news and the debate program, with a plot that would be related to the topic addressed.

References

External links
 

1989 Spanish television series debuts
1992 Spanish television series endings
Catalan television programmes
Televisió de Catalunya
Television shows set in Barcelona